Sewarhi is a town and a nagar panchayat in Kushinagar district on the banks of the river Gandak in the Indian state of Uttar Pradesh.

Demographics
 India census, Sewarhi had a population of 23077. Males constitute 53% of the population and females 47%. Sewarhi has an average literacy rate of 71.72%: male literacy is 77.54%, and female literacy is 65.82%. In Sewarhi, 14% of the population is under 6 years of age.

References

Cities and towns in Kushinagar district